Eleazus, also Eleazar or Iliazz Yalit I was the Hadramaut king of the southern tip of the Arabian peninsula, the "Frankincense kingdom", in the 1st century CE. The main harbour of the kingdom was Cana (Kanê). His capital was the city of Sabat. 

It is thought that Khor Rawri, anciently the biblical port of Sumhuram, was founded by King Eleazus.

Eleazus is described in the Periplus of the Erythraean Sea:

See also
List of rulers of Saba and Himyar

History of Yemen
1st-century Arabs
1st-century Yemeni people